Roger Wattenhofer, born in 1969, is a Swiss computer scientist, active in the field of distributed computing, networking, and algorithms. He is a professor at ETH Zurich (Switzerland) since 2001. He has published numerous research articles in computer science and a  book on Bitcoin.

In 2012, Wattenhofer won the Prize for Innovation in Distributed Computing, awarded annually at the SIROCCO conference. Together with Christian Decker in 2014, he uncovered that nearly 850,000 of the Bitcoins lost by Mt. Gox could not have been stolen by malleability attacks, as claimed by Mt. Gox.
In 2017, he appeared in a movie about the Blockchain.

Selected publications

References

External links
 Roger Wattenhofer's home page
 Mathematics Genealogy Project entry

Living people
1969 births
Swiss computer scientists
Academic staff of ETH Zurich